Bobby Skafish is a long-time radio personality in the Chicago area.

Career
 1976–1983 WXRT
 1983–1993 WLUP
 1993–1994 WKQX
 1994–2006 WXRT
 2007–2015 WDRV

Background
Bobby Skafish who grew up in Hammond, Indiana, majored in Telecommunications at Indiana University and worked at WIUS, now WIUX, the college radio station.

In January 2007, Bobby Skafish launched an internet radio station, broadcast by Live365.

In June 2007, Skafish joined the air staff of WDRV Chicago (97.1fm Chicago, WWDV 96.9fm Zion). In August 2007, Bobby Skafish was promoted to weekday afternoons from 3:00 p.m. to 8:00 p.m. at WDRV-FM 97.1.

In June 2015, he was terminated by WDRV.

He is the cousin of pioneer American punk rocker Jimmy Skafish.

References 

People from Hammond, Indiana
Indiana University alumni
Year of birth missing (living people)
Living people
Radio personalities from Chicago
Place of birth missing (living people)